Xuân Thủy is a commune (xã) in Lệ Thủy District, Quảng Bình Province, North Central Coast region of Vietnam. This commune is located on the left bank of the Kiến Giang River. The commune contains villages: Xuân Bồ, Tiền Thiệp, Hoàng Giang, Phan Xá, Xuân Lai, Mai Hạ. This commune borders the district capital, Kiến Giang township.

Communes of Quảng Bình province